Kazi is a given name, which is a female name among Slavs and Celts, and a family name in South Asia. The Celtic origin of the name is cassi, which means "láska" or "respect". The South Asian name originates from the Arabic qadi meaning judge and is typically used among Muslims. Kazi may refer to:

Kazi Abdul Odud (1894–1970), Bangladeshi writer
Kazi Abul Kasem (1913–2003), Indian cartoonist and writer
Kazi Dawa Samdup (1868–1923), Indian translator and writer
Kazi Golam Mahbub (1927–2006), Bangladeshi politician
Kazi Hayat (born 1947), Bangladeshi film director
Kazi Jalil Abbasi (1912–1996), Indian politician
Kazi Kader Newaj (1909–1983), Bangladeshi poet
Kazi Lhendup Dorjee (1904–2007), Indian politician
Kazi Mobin-Uddin (1930–1999), American surgeon 
Kazi Nazrul Islam (1899–1976), Bangladeshi poet
Kazi Salahuddin (born 1953), Bangladeshi football player and manager
Kazi Zafar Ahmed (1939–2015), Bangladeshi politician and Prime Minister
Kazi Zainul Abedin (1892–1962), Pakistani poet

See also

Cassie (disambiguation)
Kali (name)
Kasi (disambiguation)

External links 
Old Legends of Celtic

Celtic given names
Czech given names
Indian masculine given names